ZL Technologies (also known as ZL Tech) was founded in 1999 in Milpitas, California and is a privately held, developer of unstructured data archiving software. Its principal product, ZL UA, is used by enterprises to consolidate all unstructured data into a single repository for the purposes of information governance—i.e. compliance, legal discovery, records management, file analysis. ZL Tech' global headquarters is in Milpitas, California, and has international offices in Tokyo, Japan; Hyderabad, India; Vancouver, Canada; and Dublin, Ireland.

Background 
ZL Tech was originally established as ZipLip in 1999, a secure mail carrier that provided tracking, security, and authentication services. Its first customers were telecommunications firms, large organizations that required a robust architecture in order to govern their hundreds of thousands of email inboxes. In 2000, ZipLip's secure email and data tracking capabilities expanded to provide secure file share and collaboration tools for enterprise users, and in 2001 the telecom market experienced a bubble, forcing ZipLip to shift its focus to large enterprise customers. Additionally in the early 2000s, the regulatory and legal landscape underwent major changes—such as the Sarbanes-Oxley Act—and in response ZipLip expanded its focus to the newly invigorated requirements for regulatory compliance, accommodating the ingestion, archiving, and long-term governance of business communications. In 2006 the Federal Rules of Civil Procedure (FRCP) were amended to include electronically stored content (ESI) as a type of discoverable content, and ZipLip expanded its product to include eDiscovery functionalities to accommodate the new regulation.

In 2007, the company changed its name from ZipLip to ZL Technologies. In 2008 ZL Tech added records management functionality in response to a growing focus by companies on file management. The additions allowed ZL Tech to build a business model that encompasses both archiving and data management needs of large enterprises such as those in the Fortune 500. By 2012, ZL Tech incorporated feature updates in the eDiscovery module and added advanced SharePoint, Documentum, and file share analysis features.

Products
ZL Tech' core product — ZL UA, is an enterprise archive and an interface platform for extension modules, like Discovery Manager, Compliance Manager, Records Manager, and File Analysis and Management. ZL's storage management software implements single-instance storage to remove additional copies of data and offline access.

Awards and recognition 
ZL Tech was named a leader within the enterprise information archiving space, according to Gartner, Inc. in 2013, 2014, 2018, 2019, and was named a visionary by Gartner in 2015, 2016.
2019 marks ZL a record of 15 continuous appearances in Gartner Magic Quadrant for Enterprise Information Archiving Report.
In 2018, ZL Tech won the Gold Stevie Award in International Business Awards for its GDPR solutions. In 2019, ZL Technologies was the Gold Winner for Enterprise Information Archiving in the 14th Annual Network PG's IT World Awards.

References

Software companies of the United States